Captain MacTavish or Capt. McTavish or variant thereof, may refer to:

Real people
 Craig MacTavish (born 1958), captain of the Edmonton Oilers for 1992-1994
 Duncan Kenneth MacTavish (1889–1963), World War II JAG RCN captain

Fictional characters
 Captain John "Soap" MacTavish, a character from the "Call of Duty" videogame series

See also
 MacTavish (disambiguation)
 McTavish (disambiguation)
 Tavish